Stevie's Blues is a song written and recorded by Australian musician Tommy Emmanuel and lifted from his studio album, Determination. The song peaked at number 93 on the ARIA Charts in May 1992.

"Stevie's Blues" won Jazz Composition of the Year at the APRA Music Awards of 1992.

Track listing 
CD single (Mega Records – 6578952)
 "Stevie's Blues" - 4:21	
 "Initiation" - 4:18	
 "When You Come Home" - 4:30	
 "Stevie's Blues"  (acoustic)   - 2:22

Charts

References 

1991 songs
1991 singles
APRA Award winners